Mercury House is an independent trade book publishing company, founded in 1986 by William M. Brinton and established as a 501(c)3 nonprofit (Words Given Wings Literary Arts Project) in 1994.

References

Small press publishing companies
Publishing companies established in 1986
Literary publishing companies
Non-profit publishers